Mahmoud Dashti is a football player playing for Al-Arabi SC in the Kuwaiti Premier League and Kuwait national football team playing as a winger and a striker.

Youth Years
Mahmoud was Playing football in Al Arabi SC since he was young with the under-14 team but didn't win any trophies or titles but stood out to be one of the best in the league and age division.

Professional career
Mahmoud started his professional career with Al Arabi SC in 2013–14 season and was called up for the Kuwait national football team in the late 2014 of the season.

Al-Arabi SC

2013–14
Mahmoud made his debut vs Khaitan Sporting Club in an 8–0 Victory which he made 2 assists  in the game he won the Kuwait Federation Cup vs Al-Salmiya SC which he was The Man Of The Match, He played his first Classico match vs Qadsia SC in the Emir Cup semi-final second leg which they lost 2–0 on penalties which ended his season  with 4 assists and 1 goal.

2014–15
Mahmoud started the season with the Kuwait national football team to begin training early for the international cups and returned to Al-Arabi SC to start the season vs Kazma SC but did not play any games since start of the season only playing for the reserves. He won his second trophy with the team on December 14, 2014 after defeating  Kuwait SC in the final 4–2 (aet) in the Kuwait Crown Prince Cup.

2015–16

At the start of the pre-season he got injured with Cut in cruciate ligament which made him miss most of the season. On January 27, 2016 he came back to Kuwait after a successful operation in Barcelona.

2016-17

At the beginning of the season in September he under went surgery of Qdharov in his right knee, keeping him out of the green pitch for around 4 months.

National career

Under-19 & 21
Mahmoud started with Kuwait U-19 and played the Gulf Cup U-19.
Then was called up for Kuwait U-21.

Kuwait national football team
 Mahmoud was called up to the Kuwait national football team in late 2013–14 football season to compete in Gulf Cup of Nations and AFC Asian Cup.

After not making it to the team 23 man list Mahmoud was called up for the U-23 to compete in the 2015 Gulf Cup of Nations U-23.
Kuwait lost the first match to UAE 2–0 where he was on the bench.
After that he scored for in a win against  Qatar 3–0.
After losing the final to KSA 5–2.

Personal life
Mahmoud got married at the age of 20 in early 2013.

Career statistics

Club

International

Honours

Club
Al Arabi SC:

VIVA Premier League:(0)
(Runner-up):1 2014–15
Kuwait Federation Cup (1): 2013–14
Kuwait Crown Prince Cup (1):2014–15

(runner-up):1 2013–14

National

Gulf Cup of Nations Under 23:0

Runner Up 2015

Individual
Al Arabi SC Under-19 player of the year: 2013
VIVA Premier League 2014 Man of the Match: x1

See also
Al-Arabi SC

References

Living people
Kuwaiti footballers
1993 births
Al-Arabi SC (Kuwait) players
Association football forwards
Kuwait international footballers
Footballers at the 2014 Asian Games
Sportspeople from Kuwait City
Asian Games competitors for Kuwait
Kuwait Premier League players